The Loening M-2 Kitten was a light aircraft produced in the United States at the end of the 1920s, for use aboard capital ships and submarines of the United States Navy (USN).

Design
The M-2 was a small monoplane designed for operation from battleships or submarines, with either floats or wheels for operations. Three aircraft were built with USN serials A442-A444; the first used an ABC Gnat, but the others were powered by a Lawrance L-3 radial engine.

Loening developed a dedicated floatplane version of the M-2, the Loening M-3, of which one airframe (Navy serial A5469) was built for the Navy.

Specifications (M-2 landplane)

References

1910s United States military reconnaissance aircraft
Floatplanes
M-2
Single-engined tractor aircraft
Monoplanes
Aircraft first flown in 1918